Trewhitt may refer to:

Henry Trewhitt, American journalist
Daniel C. Trewhitt, American attorney, judge and politician
Trewhitt Junior High School, a high school in Bradley County, Tennessee

See also
Truett (name)
Truitt